Get On the Good Foot is the 34th studio album by American funk and soul musician James Brown. It was released as a double LP on November 20, 1972, by Polydor Records.

Critical reception 

In a contemporary review for Rolling Stone, Russell Gersten said most of the album comprises a few "horrible" new songs and many "inferior" renditions of older songs from Brown, whom Gersten accused of repetitiveness and "egomania". Robert Christgau from The Village Voice said "if this were the world's only James Brown album it would be priceless. But there's a lot of waste here, and Brown's voice can't carry ballads the way it used to".

Track listing

1972 LP

1992 CD

Personnel 
 John'Jabo'Starks – Drums
 Fred Thomas – bass
 Bobby Roach – guitar
 Fred Wesley – trombone
 St.Clair Pinkney – sax
 Jimmy Parker – sax
 James Brown – Lead vocal
 Tracks 1, 2, 5, 9, 10, 12 and 13 produced and arranged by James Brown
 Tracks 3 and 8 produced by James Brown, arranged by Sammy Lowe
 Tracks 4, 6, 7 and 11 produced by James Brown, arranged by Dave Matthews

References

External links 
 

1972 albums
James Brown albums
Albums arranged by David Matthews (keyboardist)
Albums produced by James Brown
Polydor Records albums